The 2023 Pueblo mayoral election is scheduled to be held on November 7, 2023, to elect the mayor of Pueblo, Colorado. Incumbent Democratic mayor Nick Gradisar is running for re-election to a second term in office. However, a group is collecting signatures for a ballot initiative to eliminate the position of mayor and replace it with an unelected city manager. Pueblo previously used the council-manager system for nearly a century before switching to a mayor-council system in 2017. If organizers turn in 3,768 valid signatures before March 1, Pueblo residents would vote on the initiative in a summer special election. If it passed, the 2023 mayoral election would be canceled.

Candidates

Declared
Nick Gradisar, incumbent mayor (Party affiliation: Democratic)
Heather Graham, city council president (Party affiliation: Republican)
Samuel Hernandez, food truck business owner
Thomas Martinez, retired steel worker
Chris Nicoll, former city council president and candidate for mayor in 2018
Randy Thurston, former city councilor and candidate for mayor in 2018
Deryk Trujillo, graphic designer and YouTuber

Publicly expressed interest
Dan Corsentino, former Pueblo Sheriff
Dennis Flores, city councilor

Declined
Mark Aliff, former city councilor
Jeff Chostner, district attorney for the 10th Judicial District
Steve Nawrocki, former city councilor and candidate for mayor in 2018
Garrison Ortiz, Pueblo County commissioner
Lori Winner, city councilor and candidate for mayor in 2018

Endorsements

References

2023
2023 Colorado elections
2023 United States mayoral elections